Knut Myhre (30 November 1931 – 2003) was a Norwegian politician for the Liberal Party.

He served as a deputy representative to the Norwegian Parliament from Vest-Agder during the term 1969–1973.

References

External links

1931 births
2003 deaths
Liberal Party (Norway) politicians
Deputy members of the Storting
Place of birth missing
Place of death missing